"Obsesión" is a 1935 Spanish-language bolero song by Puerto Rican songwriter Pedro Flores. The song is one of Flores' best known has been recorded by many artists. Flores was resident in New York where his Cuarteto Flores, including Panchito Riset and Daniel Santos, made his boleros popular.

Lyrics
The lyrics of the song have been referenced many times in literature since the song's early success in the 1940s. The song opens with: 

Among the following verses a frequently cited phrase is "Amor es el pan de la vida, amor es la copa divina, (English: "Love is the bread of life, love is the divine cup") amor es un algo sin nombre que obsesiona a un hombre por una mujer. These and other lyrics are referenced in a number of modern Spanish literary works. The lyrics of the bolero form the key to the obsession in the novel Las batallas en el desierto, by José Emilio Pacheco (1948) filmed as :es:Mariana, Mariana (1987) by Mexican director Alberto Isaac.

Versions
The song has been covered by artists including:
Pedro Vargas (sung as a duet with Beny Moré)
Javier Solis
:es:Ceferino Nieto single
Iran Eory single 1980 
:es:Jochy Hernández single 1987   
Lucho Gatica EP
Julio Iglesias, on America (Julio Iglesias album) 1976
Isaac Delgado on La Primera Noche 1994
Spanish Harlem Orchestra on album Un Gran Dia en el Barrio 2002

References

Puerto Rican songs
Boleros